International Front is an album by American jazz reedist Ken Vandermark, which was recorded in 1994 and released on Okka Disk. He leads the Steelwool Trio with longtime partner bassist Kent Kessler and Boston drummer Curt Newton.

Reception

In her review for AllMusic, Joslyn Layne states "Sections of this album are undeniably out, yet are balanced by other sections that feature these musicians at their straightest."

The Penguin Guide to Jazz says "'The Steelwood Trio, with long-time compadre Kessler in great fettle, is a roughly shod power-trio that finds each man vying for attention: muscular, exhilarating, unrepentant."

Track listing
All compositions by Kent Vandermark
 "Tough Sledding"  – 9:07
 "Bowling Alley Roughs" – 5:54
 "Tag" – 13:21
 "Otherwise"  – 5:42
 "Day Job" – 5:48
 "Another Orbit" – 10:12
 "Dime Store Novel"  – 6:28
 "Wrenches" – 5:30
 "No Sleeves No Service" – 11:15

Personnel
Ken Vandermark – reeds
Kent Kessler – bass
Curt Newton – drums

References

1995 albums
Ken Vandermark albums
Okka Disk albums